The Maurer MM82 is an open-wheel race car, designed, developed, and built by German manufacturer Maurer Motorsport, for Formula 2 racing categories, in 1982.

References

Formula Two cars
Open wheel racing cars